The 1905 Georgia Bulldogs football team represented the Georgia Bulldogs of the University of Georgia during the 1905 Southern Intercollegiate Athletic Association football season. The Bulldogs completed the season with a 1–5 record for the second straight year.  The season included the second straight loss to John Heisman's Georgia Tech team (he became head coach there in 1904) and the sixth straight loss to Clemson.  The only win came over non-conference opponent Dahlonega.  This was the Georgia Bulldogs' final season under the guidance of head coach Marvin M. Dickinson.

Schedule

References

Georgia
Georgia Bulldogs football seasons
Georgia Bulldogs football